The Panhellenic Association of Ergotherapists (aka PAE, in Greek ΠΣΕ) is a Legal Entity of Public Law (aka LEPL, in Greek ΝΠΔΔ) based in Athens, which was established on March 28, 2017 and it is supervised by the Ministry of Health (Greece). Ιt has its own property, financial, administrative and management autonomy and independence and is not funded by the State Budget.

Aims of the Association 
The main aims of the Panhellenic Association of Ergotherapists are "to promote and develop occupational therapy as an independent and autonomous science, as well as to provide high quality services to the community"

Organisation and Management

Organisation 
The organization of the Panhellenic Association of Ergotherapists is as follows:

 Central Command, based in Athens
 1st Regional Department - Central Greece, Thessaly, Aegean Islands & Crete, based in Athens
 2nd Regional Department - Macedonia & Thrace, based in Thessaloniki
 3rd Regional Department - Epirus, Etoloakarnania, Ionian Islands, Peloponnese, based in Patras

Governing bodies 
The governing bodies of the Panhellenic Association of Ergotherapists are:

 General Assembly of Representatives
Board of directors

There, also, exist the:

 Supreme Disciplinary Board
 Central Audit Committee.

Regional Departments 
The governing bodies of each of the Regional Departments are:

 Regional Assembly
 Regional Council

Also, there exist the:

 Audit Committee
 Primary Disciplinary Board.

Practice of the profession of Occupational Therapist in Greece 
In order to practice the profession of Occupational Therapist in Greece, it is mandatory to register to the Panhellenic Association of Ergotherapists as a regular member. This regular membership is subject to mandatory annual renewal and the certificate of registration of the relevant Regional Department of the Panhellenic Association of Ergotherapists is a necessary supporting document for the issuance of the Attestation of notification for the practice of the profession of occupational therapist by the competent services.

See also 
 American Occupational Therapy Association
 American Occupational Therapy Foundation
 Occupational therapy

References

External links 

 Official website

Occupational therapy organizations
Occupational therapy
Organizations based in Athens
Organizations established in 2017